The Portland and Willamette Valley Railway was incorporated on 19 January 1885 to continue construction of a  narrow-gauge railroad line between Portland and Dundee, Oregon, United States, which had been started a few years earlier by the Oregonian Railway.  The line was opened on 31 December 1886 and the first timetables were published the following day; however, the line did not reach Portland until 23 July 1888, due to disputes over the right-of-way.  The railroad company ran this line until it fell into receivership on 2 February 1892.

On 5 August 1892, the line was leased to a Southern Pacific Railroad subsidiary, the Portland and Yamhill Railroad, which ran the  narrow-gauge line for another year.  The railroad was later taken over entirely by the Oregon and California Railroad, another Southern Pacific Railroad subsidiary, on 1 August 1893 and was converted to  that same year.

The Willamette Shore Trolley runs on a part of that Dundee–Portland line, between Lake Oswego and Portland.

References

External links 
 
 History of the Narrow Gauge Railroad in the Willamette Valley
 Oregon Electric Railway Historical Society's website about the trolley, mentions gauge conversion

1885 establishments in Oregon
3 ft gauge railways in the United States
Defunct Oregon railroads
History of transportation in Oregon
Narrow gauge railroads in Oregon
Predecessors of the Southern Pacific Transportation Company
Railway companies disestablished in 1892
Railway companies established in 1885
Transportation in Portland, Oregon
American companies established in 1885
American companies disestablished in 1892